The International Confederation of Principals (ICP) is a global association of school leadership organisations.

History
ICP was founded in 1991, and operates through a council with up to three delegates from each member organisation. This meets three times in a two-year period. Council elects an executive committee to work with and support the elected president of ICP, an executive secretary services both executive and council. ICP has over 40 members, each member being a major independent organisation that supports the professional development and work of school leaders. 
The ICP represents school leaders across five continents; it is non-political and non-sectarian and gives a powerful international voice to school principals. Membership is open to any organisation of school leaders whose constitution contains nothing contrary to the constitution of the ICP.

Conventions
ICP holds a biennial international convention drawing together school principals from all over the world for dialogue and professional development.

Previous conventions were held in the following locations:
 2015 (Helsinki), Finland
 2013 (Cairns), Australia
 2011(Toronto), Canada
 2009 Singapore, Singapore
 2007 Auckland, New Zealand
 2005 Cape Town, South Africa 
 2003 Edinburgh, Scotland 
 2001 Gyeongju, Korea
 1999 Helsinki, Finland 
 1997 Boston, United States
 1995 Sydney, Australia  
 1993 Geneva, Switzerland

Leadership 
The current President is Mr. Ari Pokka, Finland, and the Executive Secretary is Ms Sheree Vertigan.

External links
Official website
Organizations established in 1991
Education-related professional associations
Supraorganizations